October 20 - Eastern Orthodox liturgical calendar - October 22

All fixed commemorations below celebrated on November 3 by Eastern Orthodox Churches on the Old Calendar.

For October 21st, Orthodox Churches on the Old Calendar commemorate the Saints listed on October 8.

Saints
 Hieromartyr Socrates, Priest, and Martyr Theodote, of Ancyra (c. 230)
 Martyrs Dasius, Gaius, and Zoticus at Nicomedia (303)
 Martyr Azes, by fire.
 Saints Plantinos (Platinus), Irene and Marina of Raithu.
 Venerable Hilarion the Great, of Gaza (371)
 The 63 Martyrs of Jerusalem (724): 
 Pegasus, Neophytus, Acacius, Dorotheus, Stephen, Dometius, Herman, Dionysius, Epiphanius, Stratonicus, Leontius, Emmanuel, Theophilus, Elias, John, Samuel, Eulampius, Alexius, Photius, Eutrepius, Methodius, Chariton, Theophylactus, Anastasius, Andronicus, Symeon, Theoktistus, Romanus, Paul, Agathonicus, Minas, Athanasius, Jacob, Nicephorus, Porphyrius, Timothy, Irenarchus, Auxentius, Joseph, Gregory, Callinicus, Aaron, Cyriacus, Theodosius, Eustathius, Isaac, Alexander, Eleutherius, Adrian, Christophor, Antiochus, Isidore, Parthenius, Sergius, Euplus, Ignatius, Theophanes, Cyril, Zachariah, and Anthimus.
 Martyrs Andrew, Stephen, Paul and Peter, under Constantine V Copronymus (c. 741-775)
 Venerable martyr Zacharias, by drowning in the sea.
 Venerable Baruch, reposed in peace.
 Venerable Phillip.
 Venerable Jacob, Oeconomus of Batheos Rhyakos Monastery.

Pre-Schism Western saints
 Saint Asterius of Ostia, martyred priest (c. 223)
 Saint Viator of Lyons, hermit (389).
 Saint Ursula of Cologne and her companions, martyrs at Cologne (c. 451)
 Saint Cilinia, the mother of St Principius, Bishop of Soissons and St Remigius, Bishop of Rheims (c. 458)
 Saint Fintan Munnu (Finian), of Teachmunnu, Ireland (635)
 Saint Tuda of Lindisfarne, Bishop of Lindisfarne (c. 664)
 Saint Condedus (Condé, Condède), a hermit at Fontaine-de-Saint-Valéry in the north of France (c. 690)
 Saint Wendelin of Trier (Wendolinus, Wendel), a shepherd who was famous for his holiness and is venerated at St Wendel on the Nahe in the west of Germany (7th century)
 Saint Malathgen of Cluain-Edneach, Ireland, Abbot  (767)
 Saint Hugh of Ambronay, third Abbot of Ambronay Abbey near Belley in France (9th-10th centuries)
 Saint Maurontus, Abbot of St Victor at Marseilles, he became bishop of the same city around 767 (c. 804)

Post-Schism Orthodox saints
 Saint Hilarion of Kiev, the first non-Greek Metropolitan of Kiev (c. 1055)
 Venerable Hilarion the Schemamonk of the Kiev Caves (11th century)
 Venerables Barnabas and Hilarion the Wonderworkers, of Peristerona, Cyprus, of the "300 Allemagne Saints" in Cyprus (12th century)
 Venerable Philotheus of Neapolis and Mt. Athos (14th century)
 Saints Theophilus and James, monks of Konevits, founders of Dormition Monastery at Omutch, Pskov (c. 1412)
 Saint Hilarion, founder of Pskovoezersk Monastery, Gdov (1476)
 Saints Bessarion (Sarai), Hieromonk (1745), and Sophronius of Ciorara, monk (c. 1765), Confessors, and St. Oprea of Săliște (18th century), martyred by the Latins in Romania.
 New Martyr John of Monemvasia, Peloponnesus, at Larissa (1773) 
 Hiero-confessors John of Galёs, and Moses (Macinic), Priests, of Sibiel, Transylvania (18th century)

New Martyrs and Confessors
 New Hieromartyr Alexis (Bui), Bishop of Voronezh (1930) (see also: February 12)
 New Hieromartyrs Paulinus (Kroshechkin), Archbishop of Mogilev, and Arcadius (Yershov), Bishop of Ekaterinburg, and with them Anatole Levitsky and Nicander Chernelevsky, Priests, and New Martyr Cyprian Annikov (1937)
 New Hieromartyr Damian (Voskresensky), Archbishop of Kursk (1937)
 New Hieromartyrs Constantine Chekalov, Sergius Smirnov, Basil Nikolsky, Theodore Belyaev, Vladimir Vvedensky, Nicholas Raevsky, John Kozyrev, Basil Kozyrev, Alexander Bogoyavlensky, Demetrius Troitsky, and Alexis Moskvin, Priests, and Sergius Kazansky and John Melnitsky, Deacons, all of the Tver diocese (1937)
 New Hieromartyrs Neophytus (Osipov), Archimandrite, of Moscow, and Sophronius (Nesmeyanov), Hieromonk, of Lozeva, Tver (1937)
 New Woman-Hieromartyr Pelagia Testovoy (1944)

Other commemorations
 Translation of the relics of St. Christodoulos the Wonderworker of Patmos (1093)
 Translation of the relics (1206) of St. Hilarion, Bishop of Meglin, Bulgaria (1164)
 Repose of Schema-Archimandrite Herman (Bogdanov) of New Valaam Monastery in Siberia (1938)
 Repose of Schema-Nun Seraphima (Bobkova) of Shamordino Convent (1990)

Icon gallery

Notes

References

Sources 
 October 21 / November 3. Orthodox Calendar (PRAVOSLAVIE.RU).
 November 3 / October 21. HOLY TRINITY RUSSIAN ORTHODOX CHURCH (A parish of the Patriarchate of Moscow).
 October 21. OCA - The Lives of the Saints.
 The Autonomous Orthodox Metropolia of Western Europe and the Americas (ROCOR). St. Hilarion Calendar of Saints for the year of our Lord 2004. St. Hilarion Press (Austin, TX). p. 78.
 The Twenty-First Day of the Month of October. Orthodoxy in China.
 October 21. Latin Saints of the Orthodox Patriarchate of Rome.
 The Roman Martyrology. Transl. by the Archbishop of Baltimore. Last Edition, According to the Copy Printed at Rome in 1914. Revised Edition, with the Imprimatur of His Eminence Cardinal Gibbons. Baltimore: John Murphy Company, 1916. p. 325.
 Rev. Richard Stanton. A Menology of England and Wales, or, Brief Memorials of the Ancient British and English Saints Arranged According to the Calendar, Together with the Martyrs of the 16th and 17th Centuries. London: Burns & Oates, 1892. pp. 508–510.
Greek Sources
 Great Synaxaristes:  21 ΟΚΤΩΒΡΙΟΥ. ΜΕΓΑΣ ΣΥΝΑΞΑΡΙΣΤΗΣ.
  Συναξαριστής. 21 Οκτωβρίου. ECCLESIA.GR. (H ΕΚΚΛΗΣΙΑ ΤΗΣ ΕΛΛΑΔΟΣ).
  21/10/2017. Ορθόδοξος Συναξαριστής. 
Russian Sources
  3 ноября (21 октября). Православная Энциклопедия под редакцией Патриарха Московского и всея Руси Кирилла (электронная версия). (Orthodox Encyclopedia - Pravenc.ru).
  21 октября по старому стилю / 3 ноября по новому стилю. Русская Православная Церковь - Православный церковный календарь на 2016 год.

October in the Eastern Orthodox calendar